The Copa del Rey de Balonmano 2012–13 was the 38th edition of the Copa del Rey de Balonmano, hosted by Liga ASOBAL. For this edition, the tournament undergoes a competition format change, being played as follows:

The final four took place at Palacio de los Deportes de La Rioja, Logroño on 3 & 4 May.

Atlético Madrid won its twelfth title including those that won with former name (Atlético Madrid BM) and current name (BM Neptuno).

Competition format

Knockout stage
Round of 16 (single match)
Quarter-final (two legs)
Final Four (four quarter-final winners)

Final four
Semi-final (single match)
Final (single match)

Calendar

Round of 16
Matches played on 5 December 2012.

All times are CET.

|}

Matches

Quarter finals
Round to be played in two legs. The matches were played on 27 February and 27 March 2013.

All times are CET.

|}

Matches

First leg

Second leg

Final four
The Final Four draw took place on 26 April at Consejo Regulador de la Denominación de Origen Rioja de Logroño's headquarters.

Semifinals

Final

Top goalscorers
Updated after Final Four, Final

See also
Liga ASOBAL 2012–13
Copa ASOBAL 2012

References

External links
Official website
Copa del Rey at RFEBM.net

2012-13
2012–13 in Spanish handball

es:Copa del Rey de Balonmano 2013